Mont Joseph-Fortin is a mountain in Gaspésie National Park, in the unorganized territory of Mont-Albert, in La Haute-Gaspésie Regional County Municipality, in the region of Gaspésie–Îles-de-la-Madeleine, in Quebec, in Canada.

Main activities 
At the start of the ascent, the path is common to both mountains; it is generally rocky. The ascent is steep in places.

Toponymy 
The toponym "Mont Joseph-Fortin" had been proposed to the Commission de toponymie du Québec by the administration. Fortin was a member of Fernald's expeditions in 1905 and 1906 and 1923. He was recognized for his ability to herbalise and assimilate the Latin names of plants. This toponym emphasizes the efforts of an authentic mountain guide. He died on May 30, 1960.

The toponym "Mont Joseph-Fortin" was made official on February 7, 1989, at the place name bank of the Commission de toponymie du Québec.

Notes and references

Related article 
 Gaspésie National Park
 List of mountains of Quebec

External links 
 

Appalachian summits
La Haute-Gaspésie Regional County Municipality